Headroom or HeadRoom may refer to:

 Vertical clearance, in engineering, the maximum distance overhead (the difference between the structure gauge and the loading gauge)
 Headroom (audio signal processing), the difference between the nominal signal value and the maximum undistorted value
 Headroom (photographic framing), in camera work, the space between the top of the head and the upper frame limit
 Headroom (Bleu album), an album by alt-rock musician Bleu
 Headroom (Don McLean album)
 Head Room or Headroom, alternate name for Direct to Disc (FM album)
 "Head Room", a song by 10cc from their 1976 album How Dare You!
 Max Headroom (disambiguation), fictional artificial intelligence character, and associated appearances
 Helix HeadRoom, DOS memory management software by Helix Software Company